The 2015 Asian Formula Renault Series (aka AFR Series) was the 16th season of the AFR Series since its creation in 2000 by FRD. The season saw the introduction of the current 2013-spec FR2.0 car, which raced along the old-spec FR2.0 cars.

Starting from this season, drivers and teams compete in two classes, Class A for drivers and teams competing with the 2013 FR2.0 car, and Class B for drivers and teams using the FR2.0 old spec cars. The season began on 20 March at the Zhuhai International Circuit and ended on 11 October at the Shanghai International Circuit after six double-header events. Three of them were based at Zhuhai, where AFR joined Pan Delta Racing Festival, two of them took place at Shanghai, with the other round being held at Sepang in Malaysia.

Teams and drivers

Race calendar and results

Championship standings

Points system
Points were awarded to the top 14 classified finishers. Only drivers competing in at least three rounds are eligible for points.

Drivers' Championships

References

External links
 

Formula Renault seasons
2015 in Chinese motorsport
Asian Formula Renault